Jake Guentzel (born October 6, 1994) is an American professional ice hockey left wing for the Pittsburgh Penguins of the National Hockey League. He was drafted by the Penguins in the third round, 77th overall, in the 2013 NHL Entry Draft. Guentzel won the Stanley Cup with the Penguins in 2017.

Playing career

Amateur
Born in Omaha, Nebraska on October 6, 1994, Guentzel grew up in Woodbury, Minnesota. He played two years of varsity hockey at the Hill-Murray School, finishing 2nd in the 2012 MN State Hockey Tournament, in Maplewood, Minnesota, before committing to the University of Nebraska-Omaha after his senior season.

In his freshman year at the University of Nebraska Omaha, Guentzel was named to the NCHC Academic All-Conference Team, the NCHC All-Conference Rookie Team and was a finalist for NCHC Rookie of the Year. In his sophomore season, he helped guide the Mavericks to their first showing in the Frozen Four, scoring the team's only goal in a 4–1 loss to the Providence Friars. On August 27, 2015, before Guentzel's junior year, he was named a co-captain along with Brian Cooper after a vote by the team.

Professional

Pittsburgh Penguins
After the 2015–16 season, Guentzel signed a three-year, entry-level contract with the Pittsburgh Penguins on May 23, 2016.

Guentzel began the 2016–17 season with the Penguins American Hockey League affiliate, the Wilkes-Barre/Scranton Penguins. After a recall, Guentzel made his NHL debut on November 21, 2016, against the New York Rangers, where he scored two goals on his first two shots. Despite this, the Penguins lost the game 5–2.

On March 21, 2017, Guentzel suffered a concussion on a check from Buffalo Sabres defenseman Rasmus Ristolainen. He missed the next 4 games, while Ristolainen was suspended by the league for 3 games. On April 16, 2017, he scored a hat-trick, which included the game-winning goal in overtime, to put the Penguins up 3–0 in their first-round playoff series against the Columbus Blue Jackets. He became the first Penguins rookie to score a playoff hat-trick, and only the second rookie in NHL history to score a hat-trick and overtime goal in the same game of the playoffs. On June 11, 2017, Guentzel won the Stanley Cup after defeating the Nashville Predators in six games. During the run, Guentzel recorded 21 points, tying Dino Ciccarelli and Ville Leino for points by a rookie in a single post-season. His 13 goals was one off of Ciccarelli's record.

Guentzel began the 2017–18 season in the NHL, putting up a career high 48 points in 82 games to help the Penguins qualify for the 2018 Stanley Cup playoffs. During the first round of the playoffs, Guentzel recorded four goals in an 8–5 Game 6 win over the Philadelphia Flyers. He became the third Penguins player to record four goals in a playoff game, behind Mario Lemieux and Kevin Stevens.

The 2018–19 season marked the last year Guentzel was on his entry level rookie contract. The Penguins began the season with a slow start, landing near the bottom of the league in early November. On November 24, 2018, Guentzel recorded his first regular season hat trick in a 4–2 win over the Columbus Blue Jackets. The following month, on December 27, the Penguins re-signed Guentzel to a five-year, $30 million contract. Guentzel recorded his second regular season hat trick in a 7–4 win over the Anaheim Ducks on January 11, 2019. His hat trick was the first by a Penguins player ever against the Anaheim Ducks. After a two-goal game the following night against the Los Angeles Kings, Guentzel was named the NHL's Third Star of the Week.

In the 2019–20 season, Guentzel put up 20 goals and 43 points in 39 games for the Penguins, and was voted in to play in the 2020 NHL All-Star Game. On December 30, 2019, Guentzel recorded his 200th career point as he scored a goal against the Ottawa Senators. However, immediately after scoring the goal, Guentzel tripped over the stick of Senators defenseman Thomas Chabot, and crashed shoulder first into the boards behind the net. The next day, Guentzel underwent successful shoulder surgery that sidelined him for 6 months. Guentzel was expected to miss the remainder of the season, but with the NHL pushing the start of the Stanley Cup Playoffs into early August due to the COVID-19 pandemic, he was able to recover and join his teammates for the postseason. Despite a healthy Guentzel available to the team, the heavily favored Penguins were upset by the Montreal Canadiens in the Qualifying Round of the tournament in four games.

The 2020–21 season was shortened due to the ongoing effects of the pandemic. In the 56-game season, Guentzel continued to score at a torrid pace. For the second straight season, Guenztel finished at a point-per-game production rate with 23 goals and 57 points that season. Pittsburgh once again fell to the New York Islanders in the First Round of the following postseason, where he and his linemates struggled to produce. He scored only one goal and two points as the Penguins were eliminated in six games.

In the 2021–22 season, the league returned to its usual 82-game format. Although he missed the season opener against the Tampa Bay Lightning due to the NHL's COVID-19 protocol, he made his season debut against the Florida Panthers on October 14 in a 5–4 overtime loss. He once again posted high production numbers through November 2021, scoring 15 points through the Penguins' 14 November games. From November 13 against the Ottawa Senators until December 6 in the Penguins' first ever game against the expansion Seattle Kraken, Guenztel amassed a 13-game point streak where he collected a total of 12 goals and 19 points overall. In the twelfth game, he scored a hat trick and an assist against the Vancouver Canucks in a 4–1 victory. In the thirteenth game, Guentzel left the game against Seattle after blocking a shot with his right hand in the first period. Although he would return to the game and score two goals and an assist in the 6–1 victory, the streak would end as head coach Mike Sullivan ruled him out for a few weeks on December 8.

Personal life 
Guentzel comes from a hockey family. His father, Mike, was a standout athlete for Greenway High School in Coleraine, Minnesota, and subsequently played hockey for the Minnesota Golden Gophers. Later on Mike became the associate head coach at the University of Minnesota. Guentzel was a stick boy for the team when future Penguins teammate Phil Kessel played for Minnesota. His older brother, Ryan, played collegiately and professionally. Another older brother, Gabe, played in the North American Hockey League and the United States Hockey League before embarking on a four-year NCAA career at Colorado College.

Guentzel married his longtime girlfriend, Natalie Johnson, on July 30, 2021. The couple's first son, Charlie, was born on August 4, 2022.

Career statistics 
Bold indicates led league

Awards and honors

References

External links
 

1994 births
American men's ice hockey left wingers
Ice hockey people from Nebraska
Living people
Omaha Mavericks men's ice hockey players
Pittsburgh Penguins draft picks
Pittsburgh Penguins players
Sioux City Musketeers players
Sportspeople from Omaha, Nebraska
Stanley Cup champions
University of Nebraska Omaha alumni
Wilkes-Barre/Scranton Penguins players